Horace Lindrum (born Horace Norman William Morrell, 15 January 1912 – 20 June 1974) was an Australian professional snooker and billiards player. A dominant snooker player in Australia, he lived in Britain for long periods and played in the major British tournaments. From his arrival in Britain in 1935 he was regarded as the second best player in the world, behind Joe Davis. Lindrum contested three World Championship finals against Davis, in 1936, 1937 and 1946, losing all three to Davis but coming close to beating him on several occasions. Lindrum won the 1952 World Championship which, because of a dispute between the governing body and the players' association, was only contested by himself and New Zealander Clark McConachy.

Personal life
Lindrum was born Horace Norman William Morrell on 15 January 1912 in Paddington, Sydney. He was the son of Clara (known as Violet), sister of Frederick III and Walter Lindrum. Clara was an Australian women's snooker champion in her own right. Horace was the great-grandson of Australia's first billiards champion Friedrich Wilhelm Von Lindrum and the grandson of the great billiards coach Frederick William Lindrum II.

Lindrum died on 20 June 1974 at the Delmar Private Hospital, Dee Why, Sydney. The cause of death was bronchial carcinoma. He was survived by his wife, Joy, and two daughters.

Career

Early years
Lindrum made his first snooker century at the age of 16 and his first four-figure break at billiards at the age of 18. He challenged Frank Smith for the Australian Professional Snooker Championship and on 5 December 1931, at the age of 19, won by an aggregate score of 8899–8262. Lindrum accepted a challenge from Smith for a rematch and won convincingly 8060–5942. Three years later, on 24 November 1934, he also won the Australian Professional Billiards Championship, successfully challenging his uncle Fred who had held the title since 1908. Lindrum won by 18,754–9,143.

Unofficial World Championship 1934
In late June and early July 1934, Joe Davis had travelled to Australia to play in the World Billiards Championship. Davis received a bye to the final of the Billiards Championship and played Walter Lindrum, the defending Champion, in Melbourne, from 14 to 27 October. Walter Lindrum won a close match 23,553–22,678. Davis had been due to leave Australia on 30 October but accepted an offer of a snooker match against Lindrum, delaying his departure until 7 November. An 81-frame snooker match was arranged to be played at the Tivoli Billiard Theatre, Bourke Street, Melbourne from 29 October to 6 November with two sessions of five frames played each day. Davis insisted on using the same table that had been used for the World Billiards Championship final. The match was reported as being the unofficial world championship.

Lindrum won the first two frames of the match but Davis led 6–4 at the end of the first day. Davis made a break of 56 in the fifth frame. Davis extended his lead to 12–8 on the second day and then won eight frames on the third day to lead 20–10. Davis made breaks of 56 and 54 on the third day. Davis extended his lead to 27–13 on the fourth day but Lindrum won 6 frames on the fifth day to leave Davis 31–19 ahead. On the Saturday, the sixth day, Davis won 8 frames to lead 39–21, including a 50 break. Davis won frames 1 and 3 on the Monday afternoon to take a winning 41–22 lead. With the result decided the match became more open and Lindrum had breaks of 54 and 80, the highest of the match. The final Tuesday afternoon session was abandoned, because it clashed with the Melbourne Cup. After a final evening session of 5 frames Davis finished 46–29 ahead. Fred Lindrum criticised Davis for demanding a £100 side-bet and for insisting on the use of the match table that had been used for the World Billiards Championship final against Walter Lindrum.

England 1935 to 1939
Lindrum arrived in England in October 1935 and stayed until his return to Australia at the end of March 1939, only returning to Australia for a brief period in the middle of 1937. During his stay he played both billiards and snooker, competing in the important tournaments, the World Snooker Championship and the Daily Mail Gold Cup, and playing a large number of exhibition matches.

Immediately after his arrival Lindrum played a week-long billiards match against Tom Newman at Thurston's Hall. Given a 2,000 start, he won 8,348 to 7,883. Lindrum then played Joe Davis in a billiards match, which had two frames of snooker played at the end of each session. Davis gave a 3,000 start but still won 10,348 to 9,847, although Lindrum won the snooker 14–10. In December, Lindrum played two snooker-only best-of-61 matches against Joe Davis, played over successive weeks at Thurston's Hall. Lindrum received a 7-point start in each frame. Lindrum won the first match 31–30 while Davis won the second 32–29. Davis won the side stakes for the overall aggregate score and for the highest break of 104, scored on the final evening, the only century break in the two matches.

The early part of 1936 was taken up with the Daily Mail Gold Cup. This was a handicap billiards event with Lindrum handicapped in the middle of the 7 competitors, receiving points from 3 and giving to the other 3. Lindrum won 3 of his 6 matches. The Gold Cup was immediately followed by the World Snooker Championship. Lindrum met Bert Terry in the first round, Clare O'Donnell in the quarter-final and Stanley Newman in the semi-final, winning all his matches comfortably. In the final Lindrum met defending champion Joe Davis. Lindrum led 6–4 and 11–9, before Davis won four out of the next five frames with top breaks of 75 and 78 to lead 13–12. However Lindrum levelled the match at 15–15, before winning six out of ten frames to lead 21–19, and led at the conclusion of the penultimate day 26–24. He then won the first frame of the final day, before Davis won the last ten frames in a row to win 34–27, having already won the match 31–27.

The 1936 Daily Mail Gold Cup was played as a snooker competition, reflecting snooker's growing importance. It was a handicap event with Joe Davis handicapped as the best player. Lindrum received a 7-point start in each frame from Davis but had to give starts ranging from 7 to 28 to the other four competitors. Lindrum was second in the event behind Davis, winning 3 of his 5 matches. He defeats were by 35–36 to Sidney Smith, giving Smith a 7-point start, and 30–41 in the final match of the tournament to Davis. The main part of the 1937 World Snooker Championship did not start until late February and the early part of 1937 was mostly taken up with snooker exhibition matches between Lindrum and Davis, Lindrum always receiving a 7-point start in each frame. There were four matches played over a total of 30 days and, with 12 frames a frame being played, they played some 360 frames against other in the period. Lindrum won the first match, in Manchester, 39–36, a match that included a break of 141 by Lindrum. The following week, in Coventry, Davis won 39–32. Lindrum then won 74–69 in a two-week match at Thurston's Hall. He then played a week's billiards against Melbourne Inman before another match against Davis, in Liverpool, which he won 36–35.

Lindrum returned to London to compete in the 1937 World Snooker Championship. He won his quarter-final against Sydney Lee and his semi-final against Willie Smith comfortably and met Joe Davis again in the final. The first day was level at 5–5 but Lindrum led 11–9 and extended this to 17–13 at the half-way stage. The fourth day started with a break of 103 by Davis in frame 31. Davis fouled on his first visit to the table and, after a break of 29 by Lindrum, Davis cleared the table on his second visit. Davis reduced the deficit to 21–19 on the fourth day and then won eight frames on the fifth day to lead 27–23. After the final afternoon session Davis still led 29–26, with Lindrum needing to win five of the six evening frames. Lindrum won the first two but Davis won the next two to win the match 31–28. The last two frames were shared to give a final result of 32–29.

Lindrum returned to Australia in the middle of 1937, playing a series of exhibition matches with Melbourne Inman. He returned to England in time to play in the Daily Mail Gold Cup. He was again ranked as the second best player receiving 10 point each frame Joe Davis and conceding points to the other competitors. Lindrum lost his first two matches, won the next three and lost to Davis 37–34 in the final match. He finished third in the final table. Lindrum did not enter the 1938 World Snooker Championship because he objected to certain conditions, particularly the cloth used. However he played a two-week exhibition match against Davis, the new champion, at Thurston's Hall immediately after the championship. Lindrum received 10 point each frame but Davis won 71–62. He ended the season by beating Fred Davis 39–34, despite conceding 14 points each frame.

Lindrum started the 1938/39 season playing a couple of exhibition matches against Joe Davis, Davis conceding 10 points each frame. Davis won both matches, 39–32 in Edinburgh and 37–34 in Newcastle upon Tyne. In the Daily Mail Gold Cup Lindrum was again handicapped as the second strongest player but now received 20 points each frame from Joe Davis. The tournament was a disappointment for Lindrum with him losing his first four matches before beating Davis 36–35 in the final match.
Lindrum played in the 1939 World Snooker Championship, but he lost his first match 14–17 to Alec Brown. Lindrum ended his disappointing season by playing Joe Davis in an exhibition match. Davis conceded 21 points each frame but still won 39–34. Lindrum returned to Australia, arriving i late August. Lindrum planned to return to England later in the year but because of World War II he did not return until 1945.

England 1945 to 1947
Lindrum returned to England in August 1945. He played exhibition matches during the rest of 1945 and the early part of 1946. The first important tournament was the 1946 World Snooker Championship. Lindrum won his quarter-final match against Herbert Holt and beat Fred Davis in the semi-final to meet Joe Davis in the final for the third time.

Lindrum played in the 1947 and 1951 World Championships, losing to Walter Donaldson in the semi-final on both occasions.

1952 World Professional Snooker Championship
Lindrum won the 1952 World Snooker Championship beating New Zealander Clark McConachy. There were only two entries, Lindrum and McConachy, following a dispute between the Professional Billiards Players' Association (PBPA) and the Billiards Association and Control Council (BACC). The BACC thought the championship was primarily about honour, and insisted that financial consideration should come at second place. With Fred Davis and Walter Donaldson sharing only £500 for the previous year's final, the PBPA boycotted and established an alternative world championship called the 1952 World Professional Match-play Championship. Lindrum was the only active professional not to take part.

Lindrum won the 145-frame match comfortably, taking a winning 73–37 lead early on the 10th day. The remaining 35 "dead" frames were due to be played, although in the end only a total of 143 frames were played, Lindrum winning 94–49. Snooker journalist Clive Everton has called the match "farcical", pointing out that most of the snooker public regarded the World Match-play Championship as the real world championship.

Lindrum was the only Australian to win the championship until Neil Robertson in 2010.

Later years
In 1957 Lindrum retired from competitive play to become an exhibition player, touring Australia and South Africa and describing himself as the "undefeated world champion." He had been the Australian Professional Champion since 1931. In 1963, the Australian Professional Billiards & Snooker Association asked him to return to competitive play to combat the flagging interest in the sports in Australia. The president of the Australian Association, Dennis Robinson, described Lindrum's return to competitive play as a 'magnanimous gesture', and the program published for the event contained 'A tribute to Lindrum'. Lindrum won the Australian Open title that year.
 
In 1957 Lindrum appeared in the film The Counterfeit Plan, directed by Montgomery Tully, in which a group of 'investors' watched a demonstration snooker match in which he took part. His name appeared in the film credits.

Performance and rankings timeline

Professional wins: (4)
 Australian Professional Championship – 1931 (x2) – 1957 (retired)
 World Snooker Championship – 1952
 Australian Open – 1963

Broadcasting
At 3 pm on 14 April 1937 the BBC showed a short, 10-minute TV programme, "an exhibition of play by Horace Lindrum and Willie Smith. This is the first television demonstration of snooker. Both the players are expert professionals. Horace Lindrum, a nephew of the great Walter Lindrum, comes from Australia and is one of the few snooker players who can rival Joe Davis, the champion." The programme was repeated at 9:35 pm on 16 April.

References

Australian snooker players
Australian carom billiards players
1974 deaths
1912 births
Sportspeople from Sydney
Winners of the professional snooker world championship